Fort Carondelet was a fort located along the Osage River in Vernon County, Missouri, constructed in 1795 as an early fur trading post in Spanish Louisiana by the Chouteau family. The fort also was used by the Spanish colonial government to maintain good relations with the Osage Nation. Sold by the Chouteau family in 1802, the fort was abandoned the same year by its new owners. By the time of an 1806 visit by Zebulon Pike on his expedition through southern Louisiana, the buildings were in disrepair. Although archaeological remains of the fort and its buildings were extant in 1874, a congregation known as the Church of Israel (affiliated with the Christian Identity movement) has occupied the site since the 1940s.

Origins
Starting in the mid-1700s, the Osage Nation traded furs with French and Spanish settlers, especially the French brothers Pierre Chouteau and Auguste Chouteau from the settlement of St. Louis. The Chouteaus were authorized to trade by the Spanish colonial government, and by 1787 built a temporary trading post along the Osage River in what is now western Missouri.

Spanish Governor General Esteban Rodríguez Miró first proposed a fort in western Missouri in 1791, looking to strengthen Spanish allies living among the Osage. Before the fort was built, Miro was replaced as Spanish governor general by Francisco Luis Héctor de Carondelet. Concerned that the Osage would ally themselves with the French, Carondelet requested a peace meeting with six Osage chiefs in mid-1794, at which the Osage chiefs agreed (in exchange for peace) to allow the construction of the fort. Carondelet was informed that the fur trader, Auguste Chouteau, would financially support the construction of the fort as a replacement for his temporary trading post along the Osage River. In a letter to Carondelet, Chouteau described the proposed fort buildings in detail:

Given his desire for peace with the Osage, Carondelet accepted Chouteau's proposal. According to the terms of the agreement between Chouteau and Carondelet, Chouteau received $2,000 annually to support twenty soldiers at the fort and a six-year monopoly on trade with the Osage, unless the Spanish government itself supplied the soldiers (in which case, Chouteau would receive the monopoly but no more).

Use and abandonment
After its construction in 1795, Fort Carondelet was used as the farthest western outpost for the Chouteau trading operations and not as a military fort. Pierre Chouteau operated the post, bringing his sons to live among the neighboring Osage. His sons in turn became familiar with the culture of the Osage and the life of indigenous peoples in general. For their part, members of the Osage Nation accepted Chouteau and his family. Other tribes (such as the Miami) became jealous of the perceived favoritism shown to the Osage Nation.

One of the major effects of the fort was its role in expanding the Chouteau trade operation. While commander of the fort, Pierre Chouteau (along with his son, Auguste Pierre Chouteau) expanded trade from Fort Carondelet to other Osage settlements near the Arkansas River by 1796. By 1800 rivals to the Chouteau operation began demanding that the government break its contract monopoly. That same year, new Spanish Governor General Juan Manuel de Salcedo gave the Chouteau's trade rights to one of their Spanish rivals, Manuel Lisa. In 1802, abandoning his effort to maintain his monopoly, Pierre Chouteau sold Fort Carondelet to Lisa, who withdrew the garrison and abandoned the fort. During the transfer of the Louisiana territory to the possession of the United States in 1804, Auguste Chouteau was employed by Spain to remove any remaining Spanish property from the fort.

After 1802, the fort's buildings fell into disrepair, and by 1806, they were overgrown with vegetation. According to an entry in the journal of Zebulon Pike during his expedition through southern Louisiana:

After the Pike Expedition, few travelers reported the site of the fort. The last report of the fort's existence derives from an 1874 Missouri travel guidebook relating the physical characteristics of Vernon County. While not explicitly mentioning the fort, the guidebook noted the top of Halley's Bluff had "the foundations of three furnaces" and "the remains of works—both earth and stone, covering the approaches to the furnaces and the descent to the excavations below, as if thrown up for fortifications. Later, the guidebook suggested that the works were remnants of French explorers who had built a headquarters for their operations there. 

In the early 20th century, Halley's Bluff (and the site of the fort) became the possession of a Mormon group that eventually separated from the Church of Christ (Temple Lot). This group, known as the Church of Christ at Halley's Bluff, controlled the property as a compound from 1945 until 1979. Since a dispute over control of the church in the 1970s, the compound has been the property of the Church of Israel, a Christian Identity group. In the 1980s, the church compound was home to Eric Robert Rudolph, who committed the Centennial Olympic Park bombing in 1996.

Notes

References

 Alt URL

Fur trade
History of the American West
Trading posts in the United States
Pre-statehood history of Missouri
Buildings and structures in Vernon County, Missouri
Car